Wing, known in antiquated times as Wyng, is a village and civil parish in east Buckinghamshire, England. The village is on the main A418 road between Aylesbury and Leighton Buzzard.

History
The Domesday Book of 1086 records the toponym as Witehunge. The name occurs in Old English circa 966–975 as Weowungum (dative plural case). It could mean:

"Wiwa's sons or people". 
"The dwellers at, or devotees of, a heathen temple."
The first syllables of the names of the nearby village of Wingrave and the nearby hamlet of Wingbury have the same etymology. 

The remains of the temple referred to may be under the Anglo-Saxon Church of England parish church of All Saints. The BBC programme Meet the Ancestors came to Wing in 2000 and recreated the face of an Anglo-Saxon girl found buried in the old graveyard. Wing has the oldest continuously used religious site in the country, with evidence showing the site has had religious use going back well over 1300 years. The Anglo-Saxon origin of All Saints' parish church makes it one of the oldest churches in England. 

An ancient track, part of the pre-historic Icknield Way linking Oxford with Cambridge, once passed through the village. This was used in the Middle Ages and led to an increase in the village's size, though with the advent of modern roads and motorways this is less used today. 

As early as the 7th century there was an abbey near the village at Ascott, that had been built by an unknown member of the House of Wessex royal family and given to a Benedictine convent in Angers. The Anglo-Saxon church in Wing, dedicated to All Saints, was also built at about this time for St Birinus, but evidence found in the 15th century during extensive renovations on the church suggest a Roman structure had stood on this site beforehand. It is unusual among religious buildings of this age for the church and abbey to have been built apart, it was normal for them to be constructed within the same complex of buildings. One possible explanation for this is that the church was built on a pre-existing religious site, which the evidence in the village's name and in the aforementioned archaeological finds seem to suggest. The church contains a number of fine monuments, including the "purest Renaissance monument of the mid-16th century" to Sir Robert Dormer (died 1552), and a wall monument attributed to Louis-François Roubiliac. 

Nine hundred metres to the NNE of All Saints Church at the end of the High Street are the earthwork remains of a late 11th, early 12th century Norman Motte and Bailey Castle, which is positioned at the top of Castle Hill. The castle likely had an inner and possibly an outer bailey to the East, although this has now all been built over by the road and housing. The remaining mound stands around 16 feet high and covers an area of around 120 feet.Wing Motte and Bailey castle

Amenities
The village has two schools. Overstone Combined School is a mixed, foundation primary school for children aged 3–11. Cottesloe School is a secondary school for children aged 11–18. It also has two public houses, a social club, two Indian restaurants, a Chinese takeaway which doubles as a fish and chip shop, and a police station. A Post Office is located on the High Street. Ascott House, a home of the Rothschild family, is in the parish. The village hall built in 1905 at a cost of £2000 is in the Rothschild style and is one of the most prominent buildings in the village and was formally opened by Lord Rothschild.

World War 2

During WW2, an RAF base was built close to Wing. Completed in 1941, the primary purpose of RAF Wing was for training Wellington bomber crews. With the base in such close proximity to the village, the sight and sound of aircraft flying over the village became an part of everyday life. The village hall became a popular destination for aircrew and airfield personnel where weekly dances took place. The village pubs were also frequent destinations. At the end of the war RAF Wing served as a gateway for tens of thousands of men returning from duty in Europe. The base closed in April 1956.

Third London Airport

In 1971, the Roskill Commission identified the disused RAF Wing as the best site for a four-runway national hub airport, generally known as Cublington Airport. This attracted considerable opposition on environmental and noise nuisance grounds, and the plans were first changed to focus on a coastal site at Maplin Sands in the Thames Estuary and eventually scrapped altogether. As a permanent celebration of the victory, Buckinghamshire County Council planted a spinney of over 400 trees on a 3-acre site that would have been at the centre of the airport. As of 2023, there are no airports in the UK with more than two active paved runways.

Transport
Wing is about three miles from Leighton Buzzard railway station, which is served by West Midlands Trains and Southern trains on the West Coast Main Line, travelling to destinations such as Birmingham New Street, Milton Keynes Central and London Euston. Wing is served by buses running services between Aylesbury and Milton Keynes operated by Arriva Shires & Essex and between Leighton Buzzard and Aylesbury operated by Z&S International.

The M1 motorway is 13 miles to the east, on the other side of Dunstable.

References

Further reading

External links

David Nash Ford: Wing Church, Buckinghamshire – Saxon Apse & Crypt
David Nash Ford: Wing Church, Buckinghamshire – Monuments
1st Wing Scout Group

Villages in Buckinghamshire
Civil parishes in Buckinghamshire
Anglo-Saxon paganism